The 2017 Pittsburgh Steelers season was the franchise's 85th season as a professional sports franchise and as a member of the National Football League (NFL). It was the 18th season under leadership of general manager Kevin Colbert and the eleventh under head coach Mike Tomlin. It was also the Steelers' first season since the death of Dan Rooney.

The Steelers clinched the AFC North division title for the second consecutive season with a 39–38 win over the Baltimore Ravens in Week 14, and secured a first-round playoff bye for the first time since 2010 following a 34–6 win over the Houston Texans on Christmas Day in Week 16. In the Divisional Round however, the Steelers suffered a loss to the Jacksonville Jaguars by a score of 45–42 after falling behind 28–14 at halftime. After their loss, the Steelers were criticized for looking past the Jaguars and anticipating a rematch with the New England Patriots.
With a record of 13–3, the Steelers posted their best mark since 2004, as well as their first 13–3 record since 2001. The Steelers were also the solitary team in 2017 that swept their division.

Transactions
The Steelers were involved in the following transactions during the 2017 season:

Trades

Free agents

Signings

Cuts

Other

Draft

Notes
 As the result of a negative differential of free agent signings and departures that the Steelers experienced during the  free agency period, the team received one compensatory selection at the end of the 3rd round for the 2017 draft.

Staff

Final roster

Preseason

Regular season

Schedule
The Steelers' regular season schedule was announced on April 20.

Note: Intra-division opponents are in bold text.

Game summaries

Week 1: at Cleveland Browns

The Steelers started their season on the road against the Browns.  They scored first in the first quarter when Tyler Matakevich blocked a punt and Anthony Chickillo recovered it for a touchdown for a 7–0 lead.  Later on in the quarter, DeShone Kizer ran for a 1-yard touchdown to tie the game up 7–7.  In the second quarter, the Steelers retook the lead when Ben Roethlisberger found Jesse James on a 4-yard pass to make it 14–7 at halftime.  After the break, the Browns came closer in the third quarter when Zane Gonzalez nailed a 24-yard field goal to make it 14–10.  Though the Steelers moved ahead by double digits when Roethlisberger found James again on a 2-yard pass to make it 21–10.  The Browns tried to rally in the fourth quarter but could only come up with 8 when Kizer found Corey Coleman on a 3-yard pass with a 2-point conversion tacked on to make the final score 21–18.

With their 5th straight win over the Browns, the Steelers started their season 1–0.  It also took the team's regular season winning streak to 8 straight while taking their winning streak against division rivals to 5 straight.

Week 2: vs. Minnesota Vikings

After a tough road win, the Steelers traveled home to take on the Vikings.  In the first quarter, the Steelers would score first as Ben Roethlisberger found Martavis Bryant on a 27-yard pass to make it 7–0 for the only score of the period.  They increased their lead in the second quarter when Roethlisberger found JuJu Smith-Schuster on a 4-yard pass to make it 14–0.  The Vikes then got on the board later on in the quarter when Kai Forbath kicked a 42-yard field goal to make it 14–3 at halftime.  In the third quarter, the Steelers went back to work as Chris Boswell kicked a 46-yard field goal to make it 17–3.  The Vikes drew closer when C.J. Ham ran for a 1-yard touchdown (with a failed PAT) to make it 17–9.  The Steelers however pulled away later on in the quarter when Boswell kicked a 29-yard field goal to make it 20–9.  In the fourth quarter, it was all Steelers as they closed out the game with 2 more field goals:  from 37 and 43 yards out to make it 23–9 and the eventual final score 26–9.

With the win, the Steelers improved to 2–0.  The team's regular season winning streak also increased to 9 straight.

The 17-point margin of victory marked the largest by Pittsburgh over Minnesota in series history.

Week 3: at Chicago Bears

The Steelers traveled to Chicago to take on the Bears. In the first quarter, the Bears scored first when Jordan Howard ran for a 3-yard touchdown to take a 7–0 lead for the only score of the quarter. In the second quarter, the Steelers managed to tie it up at 7–7 when Ben Roethlisberger found Antonio Brown on a 7-yard pass. The Bears moved ahead by double digits later on when Mike Glennon found Adam Shaheen on a 2-yard pass to make it 14–7. This would be followed up by Connor Barth's 24-yard field goal to make it 17–7 at halftime. After the break, the Steelers got back to work and came within 3 as Le'Veon Bell ran for a 1-yard touchdown to make it 17–14. They would tie the game up in the fourth quarter when Chris Boswell nailed a 32-yard field goal. The Steelers then tried their hand at coming back for the win later on in the quarter, but Roethlisberger was sacked in Bears territory, sending the game into overtime. In overtime, the Bears got the ball. They would win it by way of Howard's 19-yard run for a touchdown and the final score 23–17.

With the loss and 9-game regular season winning streak snapped, the Steelers dropped to 2–1 and with the Ravens' loss to the Jaguars moved into a tie on top of the AFC North.

The loss was the Steelers' third straight against the Bears, and dropped the Steelers to a record of 1–12 all-time against the Bears in Chicago.

Week 4: at Baltimore Ravens

After their first loss of the season, the Steelers traveled to Baltimore to play the Ravens. The Steelers forced a punt on the Ravens' first drive before the Steelers offense produced a 16-play, 84-yard drive which took up 10 minutes and 23 seconds of game time and led to a 30-yard Chris Boswell field goal, making the score 3–0. This would remain the score until Boswell added a 49-yard field goal in the second quarter, making the score 6–0. The Steelers finally reached the end zone on their next drive, as Le'Veon Bell scored from the 1-yard line to put the Steelers up 13–0. The Steelers scored again on their final offensive drive of the half as Ben Roethlisberger connected with JuJu Smith-Schuster for an 11-yard touchdown pass (and the Steelers failed their 2-point conversion attempt), putting the Steelers up 19–0 going into halftime. The Ravens' Justin Tucker missed a 62-yard field goal as time expired in the second quarter.

The Steelers received the ball to begin the second half, and Roethlisberger was intercepted by Eric Weddle, who was credited with the turnover after a coach's challenge by John Harbaugh. The play had initially been ruled a catch by Antonio Brown, but after review, the officials determined that Brown had never established possession of the ball, and because it had never touched the ground, the Ravens took over on the Steelers' 18-yard line. Baltimore capitalized by adding a Tucker 42-yard field goal, making the score 19–3 in favor of the Steelers. On the Steelers' next drive, Boswell missed a 44-yard field goal, and after taking over on downs, the Ravens took only three plays to score on a 16-yard touchdown from Joe Flacco to Mike Wallace. The Ravens attempted a 2-point conversion, but Terrance West (though initially ruled as successfully scoring) was stopped at the 1-yard line by the Steelers defense, making the score 19–9. In the fourth quarter, the Steelers defense intercepted Flacco twice, with the second interception leading to another 1-yard touchdown run by Bell, making the final score 26–9. The Steelers moved into sole possession of first place in the AFC North with the victory while the team improved to 3–1.  The team would win their 6th straight game against a divisional opponent.

The victory marked the first time that the Steelers defeated the Ravens in Baltimore since 2012.  It would also be Roethlisberger's first win in Baltimore since 2010. Pittsburgh also scored the most points in Baltimore of any Steelers team since 2002. Seventeen points marked the largest margin of victory for the Steelers in Baltimore in series history, and the largest such margin against any team in Baltimore since the Steelers defeated the Colts in Memorial Stadium by twenty-six points in the 1976 NFL Playoffs.

Week 5: vs. Jacksonville Jaguars

After a huge road win, the Steelers returned home for a game against the Jaguars.  In the first quarter the Steelers scored first as Chris Boswell kicked a 29-yard field goal for a 3–0 lead and the only score of the period.  In the second quarter, the Jaguars got on the board when Leonard Fournette ran for a 2-yard touchdown to make it 7–3.  The Steelers drew closer before halftime though as Boswell kicked a 34-yard field goal to make it 7–6.  After the break, the Steelers would retake the lead in the third quarter when Boswell kicked a 20-yard field goal to make it 9–7.  The Jaguars would score 23 unanswered points when Ben Roethlisberger was intercepted twice:  Telvin Smith returned one 28 yards for a touchdown (with a failed PAT) as the Jags moved ahead 13–9.  This would be followed up by a Barry Church interception that was returned 51 yards for a touchdown to make it 20–9 to finish the third quarter.  In the fourth quarter, Jason Myers added a 47-yard field goal to make it 23–9.  Later on, the Steelers' rush defense stalled as Fournette ran for a 90-yard touchdown to make the final score 30–9.

With the loss, the Steelers dropped to 3–2.  The 21-point loss was the largest home loss in Mike Tomlin's career as the team's head coach.  Ben Roethlisberger also set a new career high of five interceptions in a single game including two which were returned for touchdowns.

The team failed to score a touchdown at home for the first time since their 11–10 victory over the Chargers in 2008.

Week 6: at Kansas City Chiefs

After being blown out at home, the Steelers traveled to Kansas City to face the undefeated Chiefs. The Steelers scored first in the first quarter when Zach Fulton fumbled the ball into the end zone for a safety giving them a 2–0 lead. The Chiefs took the lead later on in the quarter when Harrison Butker kicked a 46-yard field goal to make it 3–2. The Steelers moved back ahead in the second quarter when Le'Veon Bell ran for a 3-yard touchdown making the score 9–3. This would be followed up by Chris Boswell kicking a 24-yard field goal to put the team up 12–3 at halftime. After a scoreless third quarter, the Chiefs came within 2 as Alex Smith connected with De'Anthony Thomas on a 57-yard pass to make it 12–10 to start the fourth quarter. Later on, the Steelers would move ahead by 9 when Ben Roethlisberger found Antonio Brown on a 51-yard pass to make it 19–10. The Chiefs came within 6 when Butker nailed a 33-yard field goal to make it 19–13. The Chiefs later on failed to convert a fourth down, sealing the win for the Steelers.

With the win, the Steelers improved to 4–2. Roethlisberger's record against the Chiefs increased to 6–1.

Week 7: vs. Cincinnati Bengals

After a tough win on the road, the Steelers returned home for Game 1 against the division rival Bengals. The Steelers would score first when Ben Roethlisberger found Antonio Brown on a 7-yard pass to make it 7–0. Later on in the quarter, the Bengals would tie it up when Andy Dalton found Brandon LaFell on a 6-yard pass to make it a 7–7 game. In the second quarter, the Steelers moved back into the lead when Roethlisberger found JuJu Smith-Schuster on a 31-yard pass to make it 14–7. The Bengals tied it up again when Dalton found Tyler Kroft on a 1-yard pass making it 14–14. The Steelers closed the half with 2 field goals kicked by Chris Boswell:  From 22 and 24 yards out to retake the lead 17–14 and then make it 20–14 at halftime. In the highly defensive second half, the Steelers managed to score more field goals starting in the third quarter when Boswell went for 2 more, from 41 and 49 yards out, to increase the Steelers' lead from 9 to 12 and making the score change from 23–14 to 26–14. In the last quarter, the Steelers would seal the game when Boswell hit his fifth field goal of the game from 29 yards out to make the final score 29–14.

With the win, the Steelers improved to 5–2. The team also picked up their 7th straight win against a divisional opponent and picked up their fifth straight win over the Bengals.

Week 8: at Detroit Lions

After winning at home, the Steelers traveled to Detroit to take on the Lions. The Steelers would score first when Chris Boswell nailed a 34-yard field goal to make the score 3–0. The Lions tied the game up later on when Matt Prater kicked a 48-yard field goal to make it 3–3. The Lions moved into the lead when Prater kicked a 37-yard field goal to make it 6–3. The Steelers moved back into the lead when Le'Veon Bell ran for a 5-yard touchdown to make it 10–6. The Lions retook the lead when Prater kicked 2 more field goals from 51 and 34 yards out to make the score 10–9 and then move up 12–10 at halftime. In the third quarter, it was all Steelers as they retook the lead when Chris Boswell kicked a 38-yard field goal to make it 13–12. Later on in the quarter, Ben Roethlisberger connected with JuJu Smith-Schuster for a 97-yard pass making it 20–12. The Lions scored their only points of the second half in the fourth quarter when Prater kicked a 19-yard field goal to make it 20–15. This would eventually be the final score of the game.

With the win, the Steelers went into their bye week 6–2.

After falling behind in the all-time series to the Lions 4–12–1 through 1965, the Steelers' victory moved them to 13–2 against Detroit since 1966.

The team also held an opponent without a touchdown on the road for the first time since their 28–12 victory over the Browns in 2015.

Week 10: at Indianapolis Colts

Coming back from their bye week, the Steelers traveled to Indianapolis to take on the Colts.  Neither team scored in the first quarter.  But in the second, the Colts grabbed an early lead when Jacoby Brissett found Donte Moncrief on a 60-yard pass to make it 7–0.  Adam Vinatieri tacked on a 48-yard field goal to make it 10–0.  The Steelers got on the board later on in the quarter when Chris Boswell kicked a 41-yard field goal to make the halftime score 10–3.  In the third quarter, the Colts went back to work when Brissett found Chester Rogers on a 61-yard pass to make the score 17–3.  Though the Steelers would score a touchdown when Ben Roethlisberger found JuJu Smith-Schuster on a 7-yard pass (with a failed PAT) to make it 17–9.  Getting the ball back deep in Colts territory after a Ryan Shazier interception, the Steelers managed to tie the game up in the fourth quarter when Roethlisberger found Vance McDonald on a 7-yard pass (with a successful 2-point conversion) to make it 17–17.  The defense would hold the Colts off in the last quarter.  The Steelers got the ball back and were able to complete the game-winning drive when Boswell sealed the game with a 33-yard field goal to make the final score 20–17.

With the win, the Steelers improved to 7–2.

Week 11: vs. Tennessee Titans

The Steelers went back home for a Thursday Night duel against the Titans. In the first quarter, the Steelers scored first when Ben Roethlisberger found Antonio Brown on a 41-yard pass to make it 7–0. They would make it 10–0 after Chris Boswell nailed a 41-yard field goal. The Titans got on the board later on in the quarter when Marcus Mariota ran for a 7-yard touchdown, making it 10–7. In the second quarter the Steelers pulled away as Boswell kicked 2 more field goals from 28 and 50 yards to make the score 13–7 and then 16–7 at halftime. In the third quarter, the Titans came within 2 when Mariota found Rishard Matthews on a 75-yard pass, making it 16–14. The Steelers would pull away again as Roethlisberger and Brown connected on a 5-yard pass, making the score 23–14. The Titans came within 6 later on when Ryan Succop kicked a 44-yard field goal to make it 23–17. In the fourth quarter, it was all Steelers as they sealed the game when Roethlisberger found Jesse James on a 1-yard pass to make it 30–17. This would be followed by Roethlisberger and Brown connecting on a 10-yard pass to make it 37–17. Boswell then finished with a 26-yard field goal to make the final score 40–17.

With the win, the Steelers improved to 8–2, and enjoyed the best 10-game start of Mike Tomlin's career, and the best 10-game start for the Steelers since 2004 when they began 9–1.

The victory marked the first time since 1984 that the Steelers defense forced at least 4 turnovers and 5 sacks in the same game. Their plus-4 turnover ratio was the first time this was accomplished by the Steelers since November 24, 2013 against the Cleveland Browns.

Week 12: vs. Green Bay Packers

After a huge win, the Steelers stayed home for a game against the Packers. They would score first in the first quarter when Ben Roethlisberger found Xavier Grimble on a 1-yard pass (with a failed PAT) to make it 6–0. The Packers scored 2 touchdowns to close out the first half. The first one followed an interception thrown by Roethlisberger when QB Brett Hundley found Randall Cobb on a 39-yard pass to make it 7–6. The Steelers' defense also stalled later on in the quarter when Hundley found Jamaal Williams on a 54-yard pass to make it 14–6 in favor of the Packers. In the second quarter, the Steelers managed to tie the game when Roethlisberger found Martavis Bryant on a 17-yard pass (with a successful 2-point conversion) to make the score 14–14 at halftime. In the third quarter, the Packers retook the lead when Hundley found Davante Adams on a 55-yard pass to make it 21–14. Later on, the Steelers tied it back up when Roethlisberger found Antonio Brown on a 1-yard pass to make it 21–21. The Steelers managed to take the lead when Roethlisberger and Brown hooked up again this time on a 33-yard pass to make it 28–21. The Packers would tie it up later on in the quarter when Williams ran for a 4-yard touchdown to make it 28–28. With seconds left, Chris Boswell would put up the game-winning 53-yard field goal to make the final score 31–28.

With their sixth straight win, the Steelers improved to 9–2.

The game marked the Steelers' first victory while suffering a negative-3 turnover ratio since defeating the Cincinnati Bengals on December 2, 2007. It was also the Steelers' fifth consecutive regular season win over the Packers, as well as their fifth consecutive win over the Packers in Pittsburgh.

The Steelers' 462 yards of offense represented their most since December 6, 2015 against the Indianapolis Colts.

Week 13: at Cincinnati Bengals

After winning in a close game at home, the Steelers traveled to Cincinnati for Game 2 against the Bengals. On a 2nd and 5 early in the game, Steelers linebacker Ryan Shazier suffered a career-ending spinal cord injury while tackling Bengals wide receiver Josh Malone. Shazier was paralyzed from the waist down but later regained the ability to walk and run. The Bengals scored first in the first quarter when Randy Bullock kicked a 35-yard field goal to make it 3–0. They would then make it 10–0 when Andy Dalton found A.J. Green on an 8-yard pass. In the second quarter, Dalton and Green connected again on a 15-yard pass to make it 17–0. The Steelers managed to get on the board before halftime when Chris Boswell put a 30-yard field goal through to make the score 17–3. In the third quarter, the Steelers drew closer when Ben Roethlisberger found Le'Veon Bell on a 35-yard touchdown to make it 17–10. The Bengals moved back ahead by double digits when Randy Bullock kicked a 31-yard field goal to make it 20–10. In the fourth quarter, it was all Steelers when Boswell put up a 37-yard field goal to make it 20–13. Roethlisberger then found Antonio Brown on a 6-yard pass to tie the game up at 20–20. Finally, Boswell was able to seal the victory with a 38-yard field goal to make the final score 23–20.

With their sixth straight win over the Bengals, the Steelers improved to 10–2. The victory marks the third time that the Steelers have recorded two different 7+ win streaks within consecutive and separate regular seasons (1975–76, 1994–95).

The team also won their 8th straight game against a divisional opponent. With the win, the Steelers began 4–0 in their division for the first time since 2008.

The 17-point comeback was the Steelers' largest since they came back from down 17 on December 20, 2015 against the Denver Broncos, and their largest on the road since their 21-point comeback on October 5, 1997 against the Baltimore Ravens.

Week 14: vs. Baltimore Ravens

After a tough win on the road, the Steelers went back home for their second game of the season against the Ravens. Pittsburgh scored first in the first quarter when Ben Roethlisberger found Le'Veon Bell for a 20-yard pass to make it 7–0 and the only score of the period. In the second quarter, the Steelers moved up 14–0 when Bell ran for a 1-yard touchdown. The Ravens got on the board when Joe Flacco found Chris Moore on a 30-yard pass to make it 14–7. The Steelers then moved ahead by double digits again when Chris Boswell put up a 52-yard field goal to make it 17–7. The Ravens then came within 3 when Alex Collins ran for an 18-yard touchdown to make the score 17–14. The Steelers closed out the half with another field goal kicked by Boswell from 43 yards out to make it 20–14 at halftime. In the third quarter, it was all Ravens when they took the lead after scoring 3 times: First when Justin Tucker managed to nail a 47-yard field goal to make it 20–17. This would be followed by Javorius Allen's 1-yard touchdown run as they took the lead 24–20. Flacco then found Patrick Ricard on a 6-yard pass as the Ravens moved up by double digits 31–20. In the fourth quarter, the Steelers managed to come within 2, starting with a 24-yard field goal kicked by Boswell shortening the Ravens' lead to 31–23. This would then be followed up by Roethlisberger connecting with Roosevelt Nix on a 1-yard pass (with a failed 2-point conversion) to make it 31–29. The Ravens managed to pull away when Allen ran for a 9-yard touchdown to make it 38–29. The Steelers then completed the comeback when Bell ran for an 11-yard touchdown to make it 38–36. This would be followed by Boswell kicking a 46-yard field goal to make it 39–38. The Ravens then got the ball back, but Flacco was sacked by T. J. Watt as time expired, sealing the win for the Steelers.

With the win, the Steelers improved to 11–2 and were awarded the AFC North division title. The team also managed to win their 9th straight game over a divisional opponent.  They would win 8 in a row during a single season for the first time since 2004.

Pittsburgh notched their first 3-game win streak over the Ravens since defeating them three times during the 2008 season (including the playoffs). The teams' 77 combined points marked the most in series history. The team also swept the Ravens for the first time since 2008.  With the division clinched, the team would win consecutive titles for the first time since the 2007 and 2008 seasons.

The Steelers' second consecutive 11+ point comeback victory marked the first time the Steelers had accomplished this feat since coming back from down 14 against the Denver Broncos on December 7, 1997 and then again from down 14 against the New England Patriots on December 13, 1997.

Week 15: vs. New England Patriots

After another close win, the Steelers stayed home for a game against the Patriots. The Pats scored first in the first quarter when Rex Burkhead ran for a 1-yard touchdown to make it 7–0. The Steelers tied the game up later on when Ben Roethlisberger found Eli Rogers on an 18-yard pass to make it 7–7. In the second quarter, the Steelers took the lead when Chris Boswell kicked a 51-yard field goal to make it 10–7. The Pats would tie it up again when Stephen Gostkowski kicked a 32-yard field goal to make it 10–10. The Steelers then moved ahead when Roethlisberger found Martavis Bryant on a 4-yard pass to make it 17–10 at halftime. In the third quarter, the Pats drew closer when Tom Brady found Brandin Cooks on a 4-yard pass to make it 17–16 (with a failed PAT). The Steelers then moved further ahead when Le'Veon Bell ran for a 3-yard touchdown to make it 24–16 following a Brady interception. In the fourth quarter, Gostkowski's 46-yard field goal made it 24–19. Dion Lewis then ran for an 8-yard touchdown (with a successful 2-point conversion) to make it 27–24.  The Steelers managed to make it deep into Patriots territory on the ensuing drive. However, an apparent touchdown pass to tight end Jesse James was controversially overturned after replay, and Roethlisberger was intercepted two plays later, sealing the win for the Pats.

With their 8-game winning streak snapped, the Steelers fell to 11–3. This loss prevented the Steelers from clinching the #1 seed and instead conceded control of the #1 seed to Patriots.

Week 16: at Houston Texans
NFL on Christmas Day

After a tough loss at home, the Steelers traveled to Houston to take on the Texans. In the first quarter, it was all Steelers when Chris Boswell kicked a 34-yard field goal to make it 3–0. They would then make it 10–0 when Ben Roethlisberger found Justin Hunter on a 5-yard pass. In the second quarter, the Steelers would increase their lead when Roosevelt Nix ran for a 1-yard touchdown followed up by Boswell kicking a 36-yard field goal to make it 17–0 and then 20–0 at halftime. In the third quarter, the Steelers continued their dominance when Le'Veon Bell ran for a 10-yard touchdown to make it 27–0. In the fourth quarter, the Texans finally got on the board when T. J. Yates found DeAndre Hopkins on a 3-yard pass (with a failed 2-point conversion) to make it 27–6. The Steelers were able to seal the game when Roethlisberger found JuJu Smith-Schuster on an 18-yard pass to make the final score 34–6.

With the win, the Steelers improved to 12–3, marking the tenth 12-win season in franchise history. With the Jaguars' loss to the 49ers on Sunday, the team was able to clinch a first-round bye in the AFC playoffs. The team also finished the regular season at 7–1 on the road for only the fourth time in franchise history (1978, 2004, 2010).

Week 17: vs. Cleveland Browns

After a huge win on the road, the Steelers returned home for their last regular season game against the 0–15 Browns. The Steelers would score first in the first quarter when Darrius Heyward-Bey ran for a 29-yard touchdown to make it 7–0. They would make it 14–0 in the second quarter when Landry Jones found JuJu Smith-Schuster on a 20-yard pass. The Browns managed to get on the board when Duke Johnson Jr. ran for a 2-yard touchdown to make it 14–7. The Steelers pulled away when Stevan Ridley ran for a 4-yard touchdown to make it 21–7. DeShone Kizer then found Rashard Higgins on a 56-yard pass to make the score 21–14 at halftime. In the third quarter, the Browns tied the game up when Kizer and Higgins connected again on a 5-yard pass to make it 21–21. The Steelers managed to pull away when Smith-Schuster returned the subsequent kick 96 yards for a touchdown to make it 28–21. The Browns then came within 4 when Zane Gonzalez put up a 51-yard field goal to make it 28–24. In a highly defensive and scoreless fourth quarter, this would be the final score of the game.

With the win, the Steelers finished their season at 13–3, marking their most wins since 2004, and tied for the third-most wins in team history. The team also won its 10th straight game over a divisional opponent.  They also swept the division for the first time since 2008 and became the first AFC North team to sweep the division since the Ravens in 2011. The Steelers also ended the chances of the Browns winning a game in 2017, who finished 0–16.

Team leaders

Standings

Division

Conference

Postseason

Schedule

Game summaries

AFC Divisional Playoffs: vs. (3) Jacksonville Jaguars

The Steelers faced the Jaguars in the Divisional Round in a rematch of week 5, in the first quarter the Jaguars jumped out to a lead of 14–0 when Leonard Fournette ran for touchdowns from a yard and then 18-yards out.  In the second quarter, they increased their lead to 21–0 when T.J. Yeldon ran for a 4-yard touchdown.  The Steelers got on the board when Ben Roethlisberger found Antonio Brown on a 23-yard pass to make it 21–7.  The Jaguars pulled away again when Telvin Smith returned a fumble 50 yards for a touchdown to make it 28–7, though the Steelers managed to decrease the deficit to 14 points at halftime when Roethlisberger found Martavis Bryant on a 36-yard pass to make the score 28–14.  In the third quarter, the Steelers scored the only points when Roethlisberger found Bell on a 19-yard pass to make it 28–21.  In the fourth quarter, the Jaguars pulled away when Fournette ran for a 3-yard touchdown to make it 35–21.  The Steelers came within a touchdown again when Roethlisberger and Brown connected again on a 43-yard pass to make it 35–28.  Though again, the Jaguars pulled away when Tommy Bohanon and Blake Bortles connected on a 14-yard pass to make it 42–28.  Bell then ran for an 8-yard touchdown to make the score 42–35.  However, the Jaguars sealed the game with Josh Lambo's 45-yard field goal to make it 45–35.  With the ball back in the final seconds, the Steelers scored on their last play of the game and season when Roethlisberger connected with JuJu Smith-Schuster to make the final score 45–42.

With the loss, the Steelers finished their season 13–4.  Ben Roethlisberger is also the first QB in NFL history to throw five touchdown passes in a postseason game and lose. Following the loss, the Steelers were criticized by their fans and the media for looking past the Jaguars and anticipating a rematch with the New England Patriots in the AFC Championship Game.

This would also be the last game that running back Le'Veon Bell would play for the Steelers, as he would sit out the 2018 season due to a contract dispute, then sign with the New York Jets once he became a free agent at the start of 2019.

Awards

References

External links 
 2017 Pittsburgh Steelers season statistics at Pro Football Reference 
 2017 Pittsburgh Steelers season statistics at jt-sw.com 

Pittsburgh
Pittsburgh Steelers seasons
Pittsburgh Steelers
2010s in Pittsburgh
AFC North championship seasons